Ted Cheeseman (born 20 August 1995) is a British professional boxer. He is a two-time British light-middleweight champion, having held the title from March 2021 to October 2021 and previously from 2018 to 2019. He also challenged once for the European light-middleweight title in 2019.

Professional boxing record

External links

British male boxers
1995 births
Living people
Boxers from Greater London
Light-middleweight boxers
British Boxing Board of Control champions